Joyce Salvadori Paleotti (8 May 1912 – 4 November 1998), better known by her married name Joyce Lussu, was an Italian writer, translator and partisan.

Biography
She was born in Florence as Gioconda Beatrice Salvadori Paleotti to parents from the Marche of English origins. Her father, count Guglielmo "Willie" Salvadori Paleotti, was a positivist philosopher, Anglophile and aristocrat. As opponents of Italian fascism the family moved abroad. Joyce was educated according to the principles of  Rudolf Steiner in Germany, France and Portugal before taking degrees in literature at the Sorbonne and in philology at Lisbon.

Her travels in Africa during the years 1933–1938 gave birth to environmentalist commitments; politically she was of the left and she became a member of the anti-fascist organization Giustizia e Libertà. In 1938 at age 25, she met 47-year-old Emilio Lussu, who was to be her companion, and later second husband, until his death in 1975. Together they participated in the Resistance, for which she was awarded the silver medal for military valour. 

Her literary career, encouraged by Benedetto Croce, began in 1939 with the volume Liriche. In Fronti e frontiere she gave an account of the struggle in which she and Emilio Lussu had engaged during the Resistance. Sherlock Holmes, anarchici e siluri, a piece of Holmesian apocrypha, which she published in 1986, should also be mentioned. She was also a translator, above all of avant-garde literature from Asia and Africa. In particular she is known for her translations of the great Turkish poet Nazim Hikmet.

Joyce Lussu died in Rome on 4 November 1998 at the age of 86.

References
 This article was originally translated from :it:Joyce Lussu , the corresponding article from the Italian Wikipedia, in the version current at 05:50, 17 March 2007 (UTC).

1912 births
1998 deaths
Writers from Florence
University of Paris alumni
Members of Giustizia e Libertà
Italian anti-fascists
20th-century Italian translators
20th-century Italian women writers
Female anti-fascists